Carmine J. Marasco (April 26, 1891 – July 2, 1960) was an American lawyer and politician from New York.

Life
He was born on April 26, 1891, in New York City.

Marasco was a member of the New York State Assembly (New York Co., 3rd D.) in 1915. The same year he graduated from Fordham Law School, and then practiced law in New York City.

He was again a member of the State Assembly (Kings Co., 16th D.) in 1935, 1936 and 1937. In November 1937, he ran for re-election, but was defeated by American Laborite Salvatore T. DeMatteo.

Marasco was again a member of the State Assembly in 1939–40 and 1941. He resigned his seat on January 14, 1941, to run for the State Senate seat vacated by the appointment of Philip M. Kleinfeld to the New York Supreme Court.

Marasco was elected on February 18, 1941, to the New York State Senate (4th D.), was re-elected in 1942, and remained in the Senate until 1944, sitting in the 163rd and 164th New York State Legislatures.

He was a Judge of the Kings County Court from 1945 until his death in 1960.

He died on July 2, 1960, in Bay Ridge Hospital in Brooklyn.

Sources

1891 births
1960 deaths
People from Manhattan
Democratic Party members of the New York State Assembly
Politicians from Brooklyn
Democratic Party New York (state) state senators
Fordham University School of Law alumni
20th-century American politicians